Harry Brandt Ayers, also known as Brandy Ayers (8 April 1935 - 3 May 2020) was a publisher and journalist based in Anniston, Alabama, part of the Ayers family of publishers.

Early life 

Ayers was born in Anniston, Alabama to Colonel Harry Mell Ayers and his wife. At that time Colonel Ayers was owner of the Anniston Star newspaper. Ayers attended Woodstock Elementary School, followed by The Wooster School in Danbury, Connecticut. He subsequently attended the University of Alabama, where he received his BA. Ayers served in the US Navy as an officer, following which he briefly worked for the Anniston Star before moving to work for a newspaper in Raleigh, North Carolina, where he met his wife Josephine.

Publishing career 
In the 1960s Ayers returned again to Anniston to assume control of the family newspaper, replacing his father as publisher. During this time he moved the newspaper towards being more favourable towards the Civil rights movement that was active in Alabama during this time. Ayers also provided commentary for National Public Radio.

Under Ayers' leadership, the Star'''s critical stance towards the leadership of Alabama governor George Wallace, and generally left-wing position on the political issues of the day, led Wallace to label it The Red Star.

Ayers stood down as publisher of the Star in 2016, but remained in charge of the publishing company that owned it, Consolidated Publishing Co.

 Me Too controversy 
In November 2017, during the Me Too movement, allegations that Ayers had physically assaulted female employees, in particular by spanking them, emerged. In January 2018 Ayers acknowledged that one of the incidents had occurred but claimed that this incident, which had occurred in his employee's home, had been on a doctor's advice to "calm her down". When confronted with a second incident that had occurred at the offices of the Star he stated that he would "Let the accusation stand". Subsequent research showed that allegations of spanking had been levelled against Ayers as early as 2007.

Ayers initially refused to resign as head of Consolidated Publishing in the wake of the allegations. However, as further incidents emerged he resigned from his post at Consolidated Publishing and was replaced by his wife. Ayers was listed amongst prominent media figures to have been the subject of sexual harassment, assault, or other misconduct allegations during the Me Too movement.

 Bibliography In Love with Defeat: The Making of a Southern LiberalCussing Dixie, Loving Dixie: Fifty Years of Commentary by H. Brandt Ayers''

References 

1935 births
2020 deaths
American newspaper publishers (people)
Violence against women in the United States